William Chappell (Chappel, Chapple) (10 December 1582 – 14 May 1649) was an English scholar and clergyman. He became Church of Ireland bishop of Cork and Ross.

Academic
He was born in Mansfield. He was educated at Christ's College, Cambridge, where he became Fellow in 1607. His pupils at Christ's included John Lightfoot, Henry More, John Shawe, and John Milton.

In Milton's case, friction with Chappell may have caused him to leave the college temporarily (a rustication) in 1626. Another explanation is that plague caused an absence, and that Milton's Elegy I has been over-interpreted. He shared Chappell as tutor with Edward King – his Lycidas – and it is thought that Damoetas in the poem refers to Chappell (or possibly Joseph Mede).

On his return, Milton was taught by Nathaniel Tovey. Despite the personal problems, Milton may have learned from Chappell, who was a theoretician of preaching; this aspect of Milton is discussed in Jameela Lares, Milton and the Preaching Arts (2001). She suggests Andreas Hyperius, and his De formandis concionibus sacris (1553), as influential on Chappell and other writers on preaching and sermon types. Chappell was himself a pupil of William Ames, who left Christ's in 1610. Like Ames, he was a Ramist, though he differed from the Calvinist Ames on doctrine. Chappell was an Arminian, with strong anti-predestinarian beliefs.  Lares argues for Chappell as the link to the older Christ's preaching tradition, Milton connected back to William Perkins.

In any case, Chappell had a reputation then for strictness, and for being a hard man in a Latin disputation. Stories gathered about him: John Aubrey, an unreliable source, suggested Chappell had beaten Milton. One of Chappell's disputation opponents was supposedly James I, crushed in Oxford; another (William Roberts in 1615, later bishop of Bangor) allegedly had fainted. The anonymous The Whole Duty of Man (1658) has been attributed to Chappell, though modern opinion suggests Richard Allestree.

Later life
Later Chappell was in favour with William Laud, and received preferments in Ireland. He was Dean of Cashel from 1633 to 1638 and was soon asked to reform Trinity College Dublin. He was Provost there from 1634 to 1640, replacing Robert Ussher, with Wentworth's backing; amongst other changes, he put an end to the use of and teaching in the Irish language. He was then  made Bishop of Cork in 1638.

With Laud's fall, he was denounced 
by his own  fellows, and  he was imprisoned in Dublin, in 1641, and later in Tenby, before being released. He then lived in retirement in Nottinghamshire. A monument to him was made in a church at Bilsthorpe.

Works
Methodus Concionandi (1648)
Use of Scripture (1653)
The Preacher, or the Art and Method of Preaching (1656) translation of Methodus Concionandi

Notes and references

Citations

Sources

Further reading
Concise Dictionary of National Biography

External links

1582 births
1649 deaths
Alumni of Christ's College, Cambridge
Arminian ministers
Arminian theologians
Bishops of Cork and Ross (Church of Ireland)
Deans of Cashel
People from Mansfield
Provosts of Trinity College Dublin